India has a publicly funded higher education system that is the third largest in the world, next to the United States and China. The main governing body at the tertiary level is the University Grants Commission, which enforces its standards, advises the government, and helps coordinate between the centre and the state. Accreditation for higher learning is overseen by 15 autonomous institutions established by the University Grants Commission (UGC).

As per the latest 2011 Census, about 8.15% (98.615 million) of Indians are graduates, with Union Territories of Chandigarh and Delhi topping the list with 24.65% and 22.56% of their population being graduates respectively. Indian higher education system has expanded at a fast pace by adding nearly 20,000 colleges and more than 8 million students in a decade from 2000–01 to 2010–11.
, India has over 1000 universities, with a break up of 54 central universities, 416 state universities, 125 deemed universities, 361 private universities and 159 Institutes of National Importance which include AIIMS, IIMs, IIITs, IISERs, IITs and NITs among others. Other institutions include 52,627 colleges as government degree colleges, private colleges, standalone institutes and post-graduate research institutions, functioning under these universities as reported by the MHRD in 2020. Colleges may be Autonomous, i.e. empowered to examine their own degrees, up to PhD level in some cases, or non-autonomous, in which case their examinations are under the supervision of the university to which they are affiliated; in either case, however, degrees are awarded in the name of the university rather than the college.

The emphasis in the tertiary level of education lies on science and technology. Indian educational institutions by 2004 consisted of many technology institutes.  Distance learning and open education is also a feature of the Indian higher education system, and is looked after by the Distance Education Council. Indira Gandhi National Open University (IGNOU) is the largest university in the world by number of students, having approximately 3.5 million students across the globe.

Some institutions of India, such as the Indian Institutes of Technology (IITs), Birla Institute of Technology and Science Pilani (BITS), National Institutes of Technology (NITs), Indian Institute of Science (IISc),Indian Agricultural Research Institute , Indian Institute of Science Education and Research (IISERs), Indian Institutes of Management (IIMs), University of Delhi, University of Calcutta, University of Madras, Jawaharlal Nehru University have been globally acclaimed for their standard of education. However, Indian universities still lag behind universities such as Harvard, Cambridge, and Oxford.

Indian higher education is radical in terms of accessibility, and needs radical reforms in standards, giving value, and pacing. A focus on enforcing both streamlining and holding higher standards of curriculum with the help of international academic publishers for transparency and reducing inequalities characterised by globalisation, making the vocational and doctoral education pipeline value-oriented and innovative, personalisation of the sector for students to gain immediate and valid transferable credentials in their own pace (e.g., Massive open online course, digital learning, etc.), empowering students to enter the work-force through exit and re-entry options with necessary building blocks of knowledge that leads to a skill/set of skills from a single or multiple academic fields (with required chains of knowledge), instituting stronger institutional responsibility in services for reprioritizing service delivery and for working around related complexities, working with international standardization agencies to ensure students are getting value out of the programs, etc are the basic changes needed for gaining international and national competency. The rise of interest in IT sector, and engineering education in India has boxed students with crammed knowledge that gives them lesser chance to explore and develop their passions with modern elements of education such as co-operative education, work-based training, etc. Moreover, by the end of the 4 year degree most of what students study in the beginning years becomes irrelevant or becomes subjective to knowledge degradation. Many foreign countries consider the traditional degree pathway that forces student's in working age to pause for half a decade to earn a degree in a digitized academic environment is less effective and not suitable for a growth economy. Especially in STEM fields when “micro-certificates” are a required aspect of life long learning in the field to stay relevant; many of these micro-certificates or learning blocks either function as a start of a base of knowledge or add on to an existing base. For example, most programming courses only take 3 months to learn in an academic setting and that too along with other subjects, and are the only requirement of base knowledge for springboard programming related tech jobs. Elective pathways to liberal arts education are also a needed focus in India for broadening students worldview, personal management skills, passions, creativity, and natural/concerted personal growth.

History 
India is believed to have had a functioning system of higher education as early as 1000 B.C. Unlike present day universities, these ancient learning centers were primarily concerned with dispersing Vedic education. The modern Indian education system finds its roots in colonial legacy. The British Government used the university system as a tool of cultural colonization. Colonial efforts in higher education were carried out initially through the East India Company, followed by the British parliament and later under direct British rule. The first institution of higher learning set up by the British East India Company was the Calcutta Madrasa in 1781. This was followed by the Asiatic Society of Bengal in 1784, Benaras Sanskrit College in 1791 and Fort William College in 1800. With the Charter Act of 1813, the British Parliament officially declared Indian education as one of the duties of the state. The same act also removed restrictions on missionary work in British India, thus leading to the establishment of the evangelist Serampore College in 1818. Thomas Babbington Macaulay's famously controversial Minute on Education (1835) reflected the growing support of a Western approach to knowledge over an Oriental one. Soon after, in 1857, the first three official universities were started in Bombay (Mumbai), Calcutta (Kolkata) and Madras (Chennai). Followed by the University of Punjab in 1882 and the University of Allahabad in 1887. These universities were modeled after the University of London and focused on English and the humanities

The British control of the Indian education system continued until the Government of India Act 1935 that transferred more power to provincial politicians and began the "Indianisation" of education. This period witnessed a rise in the importance of physical and vocational education as well as the introduction of basic education schemes. When India gained independence in 1947, the nation had a total of 241,369 students registered across 20 universities and 496 colleges. In 1948, the Indian Government established the University Education Commission to oversee the growth and improvement of higher education. In the 1960s and 1970s, the government increased its efforts to support higher education by not only setting up state-funded universities and colleges, but also providing financial assistance to private institutions, resulting in the creation of private aided/ grant-in-aid institutions.

Despite the departure of the British, Indian higher education continued to give importance to the languages and humanities until the 1980s. Institutes of professional education like the Indian Institutes of Technology (IITs), Birla Institute of Technology and Science Pilani (BITS), Regional Engineering Colleges (REC) and Indian Institutes of Management (IIM) were some of the more prominent exceptions to this trend. These institutions drew inspiration from reputed universities in the United States and also received foreign funding. However, the education system remained using the colonial English instead of plain English as many ESL countries do under the colonized mentality that sophistication of language used in education signifies quality of education instead of the quality of structured knowledge that is transferred. Post 1980s, the changing demands of the global economy, lack of foreign investment and political volatility, decreasing value of currency, and an increased strain on government governance capacity, slowed the growth of state-funded higher educational institutions. This led to an increased role of the private sector in the education system.

Universities

Universities in India have evolved in divergent streams with each stream monitored by an apex body, indirectly controlled by the Ministry of Education and funded jointly by the state governments. Most universities are administered by the States, however, there are 18 important universities called Central Universities, which are maintained by the Union Government. The increased funding of the central universities give them an advantage over their state competitors.

The University Grants Commission estimated that in 2013–14, 22,849 PhDs and 20,425 MPhil degrees were awarded. Over half of these were in the fields of Science, Engineering/Technology, Medicine and Agriculture. –15, over 178,000 students were enrolled in research programs.

Apart from the several hundred state universities, there is a network of research institutions that provide opportunities for advanced learning and research leading up to a PhD in branches of science, technology and agriculture. Several have won international recognition.

Twenty-five of these institutions come under the umbrella of the CSIR – Council of Scientific and Industrial Research and over 60 fall under the ICAR – Indian Council of Agricultural Research. In addition, the DAE – Department of Atomic Energy, and other ministries support various research laboratories.

The National Institute of Technology (NITs) and Indian Institutes of Technology (IITs) are among the most prestigious institutions within the technology sciences.The Indian Agricultural Research Institute is one of the best in the country for agricultural education. Indian Institute of Science (IISc) and Indian Institute of Science Education and Research(IISERs) are the premier research institutes in the field of science education and research. There are several thousand colleges (affiliated to different universities) that provide undergraduate science, agriculture, commerce and humanities courses in India. Amongst these, the best also offer post graduate courses while some also offer facilities for research and PhD studies.

Technical education has grown rapidly in recent years. Of 27.3 million students enrolled in undergraduate studies, about 4.5 million are in engineering fields. With recent capacity additions, it now appears that the nation has the capability to graduate over 500,000 engineers (with 4-yr undergraduate degrees) annually, and there is also a corresponding increase in the graduation of computer scientists (roughly 50,000 with post-graduate degree). In addition, the nation graduates over 1.2 million scientists. Furthermore, each year, the nation is enrolling at least 350,000 in its engineering diploma programs (with plans to increase this by about 50,000). Thus, India's annual enrollment of scientists, engineers and technicians now exceeds 2 million.

Across the country, tertiary enrollment rates have increased at a compound annual growth rate of 3.5% in the 5 years preceding 2016. Current enrollment stands at 34.58 million, over 15% more than the 29.2 million enrolled in 2011.

International league tables produced in 2006 by the London-based Times Higher Education Supplement(THES) confirmed Jawaharlal Nehru University (JNU)'s place among the world's top 200 universities. Likewise, THES 2006 ranked JNU's School of Social Sciences at the 57th position among the world's top 100 institutes for social sciences. In 2017, THES ranked the Indian Institute of Science as the eighth best "small university" in the world. A small university was defined as one with less than 5000 students. In 2015, the institute also became the first Indian institute to make it to the top hundred in the THES list of engineering institutes. It was ranked 99.

The University of Calcutta  was the first multi-disciplinary university of modern India. According to The Times Higher Education Supplement's survey of the world's top arts and humanities universities, dated 10 November 2005, this university, ranked 39, was the only Indian university to make it to the top 50 list in that year. Other research institutes are the Saha Institute of Nuclear Physics, the Asiatic Society, and the Indian Statistical Institute.

The National Law School of India University is highly regarded, with some of its students being awarded Rhodes Scholarships to Oxford University, and the All India Institute of Medical Sciences, New Delhi is consistently rated the top medical school in the country. Indian Institutes of Management (IIMs) are the top management institutes in India.

The private sector is strong in Indian higher education. This has been partly as a result of the decision by the Government to divert spending to the goal of universalisation of elementary education. Within a decade different state assemblies have passed bills for private universities, including Birla Institute of Technology and Science, Institute of Finance and International Management, Xavier Labour Relations Institute, ICFAI University, Dehradun, O. P. Jindal Global University and many more.

India is a leading source of international students around the world. More than 200,000 Indian students are studying abroad. They are likely to be enrolled in master's programs that provide them opportunities to enhance their career potential.

Following changes of recent times in education, India through it's NEP 2020 project plans to provide cost-effective access to higher education (post-secondary) to everyone interested through National Digital University, an Online University that works by hub-and-spoke model. This provides youth education at their fingertips, an opportunity to study in their own pace and time, and an opportunity to employees of all ages for horizontal and vertical job mobility through reskilling and upskilling with it's unique entry and exit points that is not possible through traditional offline higher education. This helps the country in attracting global talent, connections, and transforming India's educational system into an economic engine for national growth. Several international institutes in Asia have also reached out to India offering their courses through the platform. Through this innovative venture, India government provides an opportunity to domestic and international students alike in earning a degree certificate through India's National Digital University (NDU), and India government plans to make India a global leader that can provide affordable and quality higher education. A student who takes 50 percent of courses through a particular stakeholder University (India only), can opt for getting that University's degree certificate or NDU's. However, national and international equivalency of these degree certificate's would be same. Only select universities and institutions that could meet high standards and quality delivery of subjects would be allowed to offer courses or a full-fledged program through the platform, these programs and courses will be audited and certified in regular intervals by academicians and professors of practice for its communicability, content structure and relevance, course's standalone capability and required pre-requiste's to successfully engage with the subject, suggestive post- requiste's linkage per global trends, inclusivity of all kinds of learners, ROI of courses, ensuring global standards like in terns of syllabi, and ensuring best scientific practices in areas like content delivery e.g. chunking, examining in parts and as finals, solving case projects based on real world scenarios using course knowledge, and pass percentage requirement for progression to next courses. National Digital University is expected to start in July 2023 and have started requesting program and course proposals from all the Indian college's and universities. The LMS platform is build by support of top educational agencies and industries that are interested in building or already have a corporate academy, and the government plans to integrate virtual assistants with ChatGPT like features to build an interactive learning experience, course related peer learning chatrooms, national and international webinars, mobile optimisation of course pages and features, and wide opportunities for stakeholder industries to offer apprenticeship to students that meet their requirements into the platform.

Post-secondary education stages 
The new National Education Policy 2020 (NEP 2020) introduced by the central government is expected to bring profound changes to education in India. The policy approved by the Union Cabinet of India on 29 July 2020, outlines the vision of India's new education system. The new policy replaces the 1986 National Policy on Education. The policy is a comprehensive framework for elementary education to higher education as well as vocational training in both rural and urban India. The policy aims to transform India's education system by 2021.

Shortly after the release of the policy, the government clarified that no one will be forced to study any particular language and that the medium of instruction will not be shifted from English to any regional language. The language policy in NEP is a broad guideline and advisory in nature; and it is up to the states, institutions, and schools to decide on the implementation. Education in India is a Concurrent List subject.

NEP's higher education policy proposes a 4-year multi-disciplinary bachelor's degree in an undergraduate programme with multiple exit options. These will include professional and vocational areas and will be implemented

 A certificate after completing 1 year of study (vocational)
 A diploma after completing 2 years of study (vocational)
 A Bachelor's degree after completion of a 3-year program (preferred bachelor's degree)
 A 4-year multidisciplinary Bachelor's degree (professional bachelor's degree)

Accreditation
Indian law requires that universities be accredited unless created through an act of Parliament. Without accreditation, the government notes, "These fake institutions have no legal entity to call themselves as University/Vishwvidyalaya and to award ‘degree’ which are not treated as valid for academic/employment purposes."
The University Grants Commission Act 1956 explains,
"the right of conferring or granting degrees shall be exercised only by a University established or incorporated by or under a Central Act, or a State Act, or an Institution deemed to be University or an institution specially empowered by an Act of the Parliament to confer or grant degrees. Thus, any institution which has not been created by an enactment of Parliament or a State Legislature or has not been granted the status of a Deemed to be University, is not entitled to award a degree."

The University Grants Commission has provided guidelines about fake universities/institutions and degrees, including a list of such schools.

Accreditation for higher learning is overseen by autonomous institutions established by the University Grants Commission:

 All India Council for Technical Education (AICTE)
 Distance Education Bureau (DEB)
 Indian Council of Agricultural Research (ICAR)
 Bar Council of India (BCI)
 National Assessment and Accreditation Council (NAAC)
 National Council for Teacher Education (NCTE)
 Rehabilitation Council of India (RCI)
 National Medical Commission (NMC)
 Pharmacy Council of India (PCI)
 Indian Nursing Council (INC)
 Dental Council of India (DCI)
 Central Council of Homeopathy (CCH)
 Central Council of Indian Medicine (CCIM)
 Veterinary Council of India (VCI)

Graduation Statistics
This is a chart of India as per Census 2001.

Administration 
The institutional framework of higher education in India consists of Universities and Colleges. As reported in 2015, India has 760 universities and 38,498 colleges. There are three types of universities: Conventional Universities, Deemed Universities and Institutions of National Importance. While Conventional Universities are established through Act of Parliament or State Legislatures, Deemed Universities award degrees through the notification of the central government. Institutes of National Importance are those that have been awarded the status by Parliament.

The education system of India falls broadly under the Ministry of Human Resource Development(MHRD). Amongst the branches of the MHRD, the Department of Higher Education is responsible for overseeing the growth of the higher education sector. The Department aims to improve quality of and access to higher education for all sections of the population. One of the key objectives of the Department is to increase the Gross Enrolment Ratio (GER) in higher education to 30% by 2020. Some of the other objectives of the department include: expansion of institutional base, greater inclusion of minorities, removal of regional disparities, infrastructural improvement and increased global participation.

Current government initiatives include:

 Rashtriya Uchattar Shiksha Abhiyan - A total of 316 state public universities and 13,024 colleges will be covered under the Rashtriya Uchattar Shiksha Abhiyan, a plan to manage funding for higher education. This is a scheme to develop state university by central govt funding (60% for general category states, 90% for special category states, 100% for union territories).
 Scheme of Integrating Persons With Disabilities In The Mainstream Of Technical And Vocational Education - Caters to around 50 polytechnics in the country and provides them with grants-in-aid aimed at facilitating greater integration of disabled individuals into higher education.
 Scheme of Pandit Madan Mohan Malaviya National Mission on Teachers and Teaching (PMMMNMTT) - The purpose of this scheme is to raise the quantity and quality of teaching staff across schools and colleges. It also aims to create better institutional frameworks in order to cultivate change in the positive direction.

Rankings 

University rankings are used to measure and compare institutional quality based on a range of indicators related to research, reputation and teaching. Indian government's National Institutional Ranking Framework, or NIRF is the mechanism for measuring quality and also intended to determine funding and world-class university endeavors. While being popular, NIRF rankings have been criticized for being inaccurate and biased. The Indian Institute of Technology (BHU) Varanasi has criticised NIRF rankings multiple times.

The Indian Institute of Technology, Madras was ranked 1st among Overall Institutions in NIRF Overall Rankings 2022 with a score of 87.59, followed by IISc Banglore, IIT Bombay, IIT Delhi, IIT Kanpur and IIT Kharagpur. The Indian Institute of Science (IISc) was ranked 1st among Indian Universities in NIRF University Rankings 2022 with a score of 83.57 followed by Jawaharlal Nehru University, Jamia Millia Islamia, Jadavpur University, Amrita Vishwa Vidyapeetham and Banaras Hindu University. The Indian Institute of Technology, Madras was ranked 1st among the Indian Engineering Institutions in NIRF Engineering Rankings 2022 with a score of 90.04 followed by IIT Delhi, IIT Bombay, IIT Kanpur and IIT Kharagpur. The Indian Institute of Management Ahmedabad was ranked 1st among the Indian Management Institutions in NIRF Management Rankings 2022 with a score of 83.35 followed by IIM Banglore, IIM Calcutta, IIT Delhi and IIM Kozhikode. The All India Institute of Medical Sciences, Delhi was ranked 1st among the Indian Medical Institutions in NIRF Medical Rankings 2022 with a score of 91.60 followed by PGIMER, Christian Medical College, NIMHANS and Banaras Hindu University.  The "Institutions of Eminence (IoE)" initiative by the Government of India aims to build top-ranked Indian universities by providing autonomy and funding (only for public universities) and identified six institutions.

The University of Mumbai was ranked 41 among the Top 50 Engineering Schools of the world by America's news broadcasting firm Business Insider in 2012 and was the only university in the list from the five emerging BRICS nations (viz. Brazil, Russia, India, China, and South Africa). It was ranked at 62 in the QS BRICS University rankings for 2013 and was India's 3rd best Multi Disciplinary University in the QS University ranking of Indian Universities after University of Calcutta and Delhi University.

Three Indian universities were listed in the Times Higher Education list of the world's top 200 universities — Indian Institutes of Technology, Indian Institutes of Management, and Jawaharlal Nehru University in 2005 and 2006. Six Indian Institutes of Technology and the Birla Institute of Technology and Science Pilani were listed among the top 20 science and technology schools in Asia by Asiaweek. The Indian School of Business situated in Hyderabad was ranked number 12 in global MBA rankings by the Financial Times of London in 2010 while the All India Institute of Medical Sciences has been recognised as a global leader in medical research and treatment. The Quacquarelli Symonds (QS) World University Rankings published in 2013 ranked IIT Delhi at number 222 with a 49.4% score, IIT Bombay at 233, and IIT Kanpur at 295. No Indian universities appear in the top 200 worldwide except IISc Bangalore which is ranked at 147.

Challenges 
In the last 30 years, higher education in India has witnessed rapid and impressive growth. The increase in the number of institutions is, however, disproportionate to the quality of education that is being dispersed. Unplanned over-expansion is often criticized as one of the biggest downfalls of Indian higher education. Many institutions suffer from subpar quality and a lack of funding. As a result, entry into the top institutions is highly competitive and translates into a contest for higher entrance test scores and better private coaching institutes.

Higher education in India faces problems ranging from income and gender disparities in enrolment, to poor quality of faculty and teaching and even to a general lack of motivation and interest amongst students. Industries cite skill shortage as one of the major factors contributing to the mounting number of unemployed graduates. Some of the main challenges faced by the Indian higher education system include:

Financing – The inability of the state to fund the expanding higher education system has resulted in the rapid growth of private higher education. In addition, diminished governmental financial support adversely affects small and rural educational institutions. A growing number of public institutions are forced to resort to self-financing courses and high tuition costs. The private sector's primary modes of financing include donations, capitation fees and exorbitant fee rates. This in turn limits general accessibility to higher education, by catering to only an elite few.
Enrolment – As of  2007, only around 11% of the 18 – 23 year old population of India, is enrolled in higher education. On the whole, India has an enrolment rate of 9% which is similar to that of other lower middle income countries. The population that is enrolled in higher education consists largely of urban metropolitan dwellers. Rural enrolment in higher education is very low. Moreover, a majority of the recorded enrolment is at the undergraduate level. Over the last 4 years, Indian higher education has maintained a steady female enrolment rate of around 45%. Although the gender gap in enrolment has decreased significantly post-independence, there still exists a disparity amongst different departments. Technology, medicine and commerce are some of the areas of study that are heavily male-dominated while humanities departments show the opposite trend.
Accreditation - Driven by market opportunities and entrepreneurial zeal, many institutions are taking advantage of the lax regulatory environment to offer 'degrees' not approved by Indian authorities, and many institutions are functioning as pseudo non-profit organisations, developing sophisticated financial methods to siphon off the 'profits'. Regulatory authorities like UGC and AICTE have been trying to extirpate private universities that run courses with no affiliation or recognition. Students from rural and semi-urban background often fall prey to these institutes and colleges.
Quality - The quality of programs structure-wise and quality-wise are substandard and lack objectives that can meet the basic industrial requirement of "skilled-professionals." However, the assessment methods employed are taxing and the pacing of the courses (quantity over quality approach) are made forcefully quick under the assumption that these are the essential indicators of 'show' quality (appearance quality). These unscientific strategies and promotion of survival mentality instead of growth mentality leads to unsuccessful learning among students. Streamlining of bachelor's program was brought in the Indian system by following other countries by educators who proved they could give the same quality that a four year degree could provide with a three year degree. However, the vision of these resolute educators are lost in time, and sub-standardization and political objectives took over the program structure. For example, when a 21st century three year Indian bachelor's program is compared with a four year International bachelor's programs it would be in quality only worth of a two year college program because usually the first year of these programs are heavily focused on general and arts subjects. When core courses of these programs that cover the same topic are compared, Indian courses lack both leading building blocks of learning content, and the depth and fluidity of international courses. This lack of quality in education result students gaining substandard and unclear knowledge which in-turn leads to mass unemployment rates among educated youths of India, and it's primarily due to this learned incompetency or incapacity. As a part of ongoing NEP reformation, India government plans to change the academic curriculums from academicians perspective to professor of practice (industry) perspectives.
Politics - Higher education is a high stakes issue in India. It is subject to heavy government involvement. Despite the system's lack of state funding, 15.5% of government expenditure goes toward higher education. Also, many prominent political figures either own or sit on the managerial board of the Universities. This leads to the exertion of intense political pressures on the administration of these institutions. Caste based reservations make Indian higher education an even more contested topic. While some make the case that caste-based quotas are necessary to tackle prevailing socio-economic disparities, others see it as exclusionary to upper-caste individuals. The NEP reformation further helps to increase these problems where educators will hold a power to act based on caste and religion based politics in determining who will go further in studies and who should not. This effectively reduces the race for quality education at quality institutions in favor of majority power holders. As a result of biased inclusionism that does not fit for needs of the society as whole and the historic exclusionism of minorities, student activisms are rampant, apart from this political organization of academic staff are widespread to protect their own interests.

The complex socio-political nature of the education sector in India makes it difficult to implement social reform. As a result, the overall quality of education suffers.

Student advisory 
While fee regulatory agencies fix a fee that cover expenses incurred by an institution along with a basic surplus, many institutions have been charging a fee that makes the venture profiteering. All India Council for Technical Education (AICTE), the regulatory body for technical education in India, has called "upon the students, parents and the general public not to pay any capitation fee or any other fee other than that mentioned in the Prospectus of the Institutions for consideration of admission." AICTE also mentions that the fee charged to students, including for programs such as PGDM, has to be approved by the fee regulatory committee of the state, and the institute should mention the fee on its website. As per AICTE norms, the business schools are not meant to charge a fee higher than what is mentioned in the prospectus. Educational regulatory agencies, at the national level and the regional level, have mandated that an institution should include the fee in the prospectus.

See also 

 Education in India
 Capitation fee
 Academic ranks in India
 Ministry of Education (India)
 National Education Policy 2020
 Science and technology in India
 Medical education in India
 Vocational education in India
 List of universities in India
 University Grants Commission (India)
 List of institutions of higher education in India
 List of countries by spending on education (% of GDP)

References

 
India